
A book review is a form of literary criticism in which a book is merely described (summary review) or analyzed based on content, style, and merit. 
A book review may be a primary source, opinion piece, summary review or scholarly review. Books can be reviewed for printed periodicals, magazines and newspapers, as school work, or for book websites on the Internet. A book review's length may vary from a single paragraph to a substantial essay. Such a review may evaluate the book on the basis of personal taste. Reviewers may use the occasion of a book review for an extended essay that can be closely or loosely related to the subject of the book, or to promulgate their own ideas on the topic of a fiction or non-fiction work.

Some journals are devoted to book reviews, and reviews are indexed in databases such as Book Review Index and Kirkus Reviews; but many more book reviews can be found in newspaper and scholarly databases such as Arts and Humanities Citation Index, Social Sciences Citation Index and discipline-specific databases.

Photios I of Constantinople has been called "the inventor of the book-review" for his work, Bibliotheca.

See also
Amazon.com controversies
Australian Book Review
BookBrowse
Booklist
The Book Club Bible
Claremont Review of Books
Kirkus Reviews
Library Journal
Literary criticism
London Review of Books
National Book Critics Circle
The New York Review of Books
Publishers Weekly
Self-Publishing Review
Shelf Awareness

References

Further reading
Chen, C. C. (1976), Biomedical, Scientific and Technical Book Reviewing, Scarecrow Press, Metuchen, NJ.
 
 
Lindholm-Romantschuk, Y. (1998). Scholarly book reviewing in the social sciences and humanities. The flow of ideas within and among disciplines. Westport, Connecticut: Greenwood Press.
Miranda, E. O. (1996), "On book reviewing", Journal of Educational Thought, Vol. 30 No. 2, pp. 191–202.
Motta-Roth, D. (1998), "Discourse analysis and academic book reviews: a study of text and disciplinary cultures", in Fortanet, I. (Ed), Genre Studies in English for Academic Purposes, Universitat Jaume, Castelló de la Plana, pp. 29–58.
Nicolaisen, J. (2002a), "Structure-based interpretation of scholarly book reviews: a new research technique", Proceedings of the Fourth International Conference on Conceptions of Library and Information Science, pp. 123–135. Available: https://web.archive.org/web/20050818220548/http://www.db.dk/jni/Articles/Abstract_Colis4.htm
 
 
 
Rampola, Mary Lynn (2010). "Critiques and book reviews", A Pocket Guide to Writing in History, Sixth Edition, pp. 26–28.
Riley, L. E. & Spreitzer, E. A. (1970), "Book reviewing in the social sciences", The American Sociologist, Vol. 5 (November), pp. 358–363.
 
 
 
Snizek, W. E. & Fuhrman, E. R. (1979), "Some factors affecting the evaluative content of book reviews in sociology", The American Sociologist, Vol. 14 (May), pp. 108–114.

External links

Book reviews at writingcenter.unc.edu

 
Literary criticism